Zhongtang Township is a township under the administration of Qianjiang District, Chongqing, China. , it has 2 residential communities and 3 villages under its administration.

References 

Township-level divisions of Chongqing